Steele Hills, are a ridge of hills, east of the Tres Alamos Wash valley and the Sulphur Springs Valley in Cochise County, Arizona.

References

Hills of Arizona
Mountain ranges of Cochise County, Arizona